Jan Ivar "Janne" Halvarsson (26 December 1942 – 5 May 2020) was a Swedish cross-country skier.

Career 
He competed at the 1968 Winter Olympics in the 15, 30, 50 and 4 × 10 km events and won a silver medal in the relay, finishing fifth in the 15 km and seventh in the 50 km. He won a bronze medal in the 4 × 10 km relay at the 1970 FIS Nordic World Ski Championships.

During his skiing career Halvarsson was known for his waxing skills. Therefore, after retiring he was invited to cover this area at the Swedish national team, but left after quarrels with the skiing federation. He later ran a joiner’s workshop in Hammerdal.

Halvarsson died on 5 May 2020, aged 77.

Cross-country skiing results
All results are sourced from the International Ski Federation (FIS).

Olympic Games
 1 medal – (1 silver)

World Championships
 1 medal – (1 bronze)

References

External links
 
 World Championship results 

1942 births
2020 deaths
Cross-country skiers at the 1968 Winter Olympics
Swedish male cross-country skiers
Olympic medalists in cross-country skiing
FIS Nordic World Ski Championships medalists in cross-country skiing
Medalists at the 1968 Winter Olympics
Olympic silver medalists for Sweden
People from Östersund
20th-century Swedish people